Bulgaria participated at the 2017 Summer Universiade, in Taipei, Taiwan with 10 competitors in 5 sports.

Competitors
The following table lists Bulgaria's delegation per sport and gender.

Athletics

Track Events

Field Events

Fencing

Judo

Swimming

Taekwondo

References

Nations at the 2017 Summer Universiade
2017 in Bulgarian sport